Pakalum Paathiravum is a 2023 Malayalam  language action family thriller film, directed by Ajai Vasudev, starring Kunchacko Boban, Rajisha Vijayan and Guru Somasundaram in lead roles. The film was announced on 5 December 2021 and the principal photography started the next day. The film was released on 3 March 2023. The movie is a remake of 2018 Kannada movie Aa Karaala Ratri.

Summary 
Pakalum Paathiravum is the story of Michael, a wildlife photographer, who starts his journey from Kochi to Mysore with a hideous intent. The movie discusses the uptight moments that happen when he passes through the Maoist-occupied inlands of Wayanad.

Cast 
 Kunchacko Boban as Michael
 Rajisha Vijayan as Mercy
 Guru Somasundaram as Janakiraman
 Gokulam Gopalan as Father
 Seetha
 Manoj K U as Vareeth
 Divyadarshan

Production
Director Ajai Vasudev, who has helmed three Mammootty starrers previously, announced his fourth film for Sree Gokulam Movies starring Kunchacko Boban and Rajisha Vijayan. Actor Guru Somasundaram, who played the antagonist in Minnal Murali was signed to play an important role. Sam C. S. was signed to compose the background score. Producer Gokulam Gopalan also played an important role.

References

External links
 

Indian thriller films
Malayalam remakes of Kannada films